The Western Ethiopian Shield is a small geological shield along the western border of Ethiopia. Its plutons were formed between 830 and 540 million years ago.

See also
Craton
Platform
Basement
Platform basement

References

Cratons
Geology of Africa
Geology of Ethiopia

lv:Arābijas-Nūbijas vairogs